In probability theory and directional statistics, a wrapped Lévy distribution is a wrapped probability distribution that results from the "wrapping" of the Lévy distribution around the unit circle.

Description 

The pdf of the wrapped Lévy distribution is

Expressing the above pdf in terms of the characteristic function of the Lévy distribution yields:

In terms of the circular variable  the circular moments of the wrapped Lévy distribution are the characteristic function of the Lévy distribution evaluated at integer arguments:

where  is some interval of length . The first moment is then the expectation value of z, also known as the mean resultant, or mean resultant vector:

The mean angle is

and the length of the mean resultant is

See also 

 Wrapped distribution
 Directional statistics

References 

 

Continuous distributions
Directional statistics